HJ Dora is a 1965 batch IPS officer of Andhra Pradesh cadre, the former Director General of Police, Andhra Pradesh and former Vigilance Commissioner, Government of India. Dora joined the Indian Police Service in 1965 and was allotted to Andhra Pradesh Cadre. After serving as an additional D.G. of Police (C.I.D.), in Andhra Pradesh, he was promoted to the Director General of Police for the State in 1996. In 2002 he went on deputation as Director General of Police to the Central Industrial Security Force (CISF) in New Delhi. He also served as the president of Indian Olympic Weight Lifting Association and was also the Chef-de-mission of the Indian contingent to the 2006 Commonwealth Games. In 1993, Dora was one of the 40-odd policemen marked for death by the People's War Group (PWG).

Dora is the recipient of President's police medal for Distinguished Services, Police Medal for Meritorious services, and Police Medal of Gallantry.

Early life
He was born in 1943 and hails from Srikakulam district, Andhra Pradesh. After completing his Masters's in Economics from Andhra University in Vishakhapatnam, he joined the Indian Police Service in 1965.

Career
From 1989 to late 1992, he served as the Vice Chairman and Managing Director of the Andhra Pradesh State Road Transport Corporation. He later served as Commissioner of Police, Hyderabad and as Director General and Inspector-general of police, Andhra Pradesh. He served as a police officer in various districts including Anantapur, Karimnagar, and Krishna through 1984. After that, he served with the police intelligence for five years. He also worked as Director General, Central Industrial Security Force, Delhi and as Vigilance Commissioner, Central Vigilance Commission.

Dora joined the GMR group in 2006 as advisor security of the Delhi International Airport during the privatization transition after retiring from the police service.

Books

References

Living people
Indian civil servants
Indian Police Service officers
1943 births